Thallic can refer to:

 Macrothallic, meaning large bodied - usually referring to Seaweed
 Thallus, an undifferentiated vegetative tissue of plants and fungi
 Thallic compound, a compound which contains thallium in the +3 oxidation state